The 1971–72 Montana Grizzlies basketball team represented the University of Montana during the 1971–72 NCAA Division I men's basketball season. Charter members of the Big Sky Conference, the Grizzlies were led by first-year head coach Jud Heathcote and played their home games on campus at Dahlberg Arena in Missoula, Montana. They finished the regular season at 14–11, with a 7–7 conference record.

The Big Sky conference tournament debuted four years later, in 1976.

Heathcote, an assistant at Washington State under Marv Harshman, was hired in March 1971.

References

External links
Sports Reference – Montana Grizzlies: 1971–72 basketball season

Montana Grizzlies basketball seasons
Montana
Montana Grizzlies basketball
Montana Grizzlies basketball